The 41st Golden Raspberry Awards, or Razzies, was an awards ceremony that honored the worst the film industry had to offer in 2020 along with the first two months of 2021. It took place on April 24, 2021. The awards are based on votes from members of the Golden Raspberry Foundation. The nominees were announced on March 11, 2021. The COVID-19 pandemic and subsequent cinema closings, combined with the example set by other contemporary award shows (particularly the Oscars), resulted in streaming media being valid for nomination for the first time.

Schedule
Adapted from the Golden Raspberry Awards Official Website.

Winners and nominees
The nominees were revealed on March 11, 2021.

Films with multiple nominations and wins
The following films received several nominations:

The following films received multiple wins:

References

External links

Golden Raspberry Awards ceremonies
Golden Raspberry
Golden Raspberry